Jack Daniel Randall (born 7 July 1992) is a professional footballer who is currently a free agent after being released by Aldershot Town.

Career
Randall started his career as a trainee with Crystal Palace, before signing for Aldershot Town. His debut was delayed after he fractured a bone in his ankle during a pre-season friendly. Randall made his debut on 2 November 2010, for Aldershot in their 2–2 away draw with Hereford United in League Two, replacing Glen Little in the 85th minute.

References

External links
Aldershot Town profile

1992 births
Living people
Footballers from Bromley
English footballers
Association football midfielders
Aldershot Town F.C. players
English Football League players